Slidell High School may refer to:

Slidell High School (Louisiana)
Slidell High School (Texas)